Hui-cheol or Hee-chul is a Korean masculine given name. The meaning differs based on the hanja used to write each syllable of the name. There are 25 hanja with the reading "hee" and 11 hanja with the reading "chul" on the South Korean government's official list of hanja which may be used in given names.

People with this name include:
Chun Hee-chul (born 1973), South Korean basketball player
Kim Hee-chul (born 1983), South Korean singer, member of boy band Super Junior
Hichori Morimoto (born 1981), Japanese baseball player of Korean descent
Park Hee-chul (born 1986), South Korean football player

See also
List of Korean given names

References

Korean masculine given names